The 2014 Season was Pune City's 1st season in existence in the Indian Super League. They ended their first season on 6th as position of the inaugural edition of the Indian Super League.

Background

Signings

Foreign signings

Drafted domestic players

Drafted foreign players

Players and staff

Squad

Coaching staff

Indian Super League

League table

Results summary

Results by round

Matches

Squad statistics

Appearances and goals

|-
|}

Goal scorers

Disciplinary record

References

FC Pune City seasons
Pune